Bert Everett (27 November 1904 – 22 May 1958) was an Australian rules footballer who played for the Carlton Football Club and Collingwood Football Club in the Victorian Football League (VFL).

Notes

External links 

Bert Everett's profile at Blueseum

1904 births
1958 deaths
Carlton Football Club players
Collingwood Football Club players
Brunswick Football Club players
Australian rules footballers from Victoria (Australia)